Andholan is the third album by the Indo-Pak band, Mekaal Hasan Band, after Sampooran (2004) and Saptak (2009). This album was released in 2014, by Times Music.

Release
Mekaal Hasan Band started working on the album in 2013. At first, MHB's old vocalist Javed Bashir was to be the vocalist on the album. Later, Mekaal confirmed that Javed Bashir would not be a part of the album. Instead, the album would feature a new line-up with new band members, with Sharmistha Chatterjee as the lead vocalist.
The album was released on iTunes on 17 September 2014. The physical CDs were released soon after.

Track listing

 Ghunghat
 Champakalli
 Bheem
 Sayon
 Maalkauns
 Sindhi
 Megh
 Kinarey

Album description
Andholan contains eight tracks and has been described as a nice album, up to the same levels as other MHB albums. A description by the band themselves have been given on the band's official website:

Personnel
Mekaal Hasan - Guitar
Ahsan Papu - Flute
Sheldon D'Silva - Bass
Gino Banks - Drums
Sharmistha Chatterjee - Vocals

References

External links
 Official Website

2014 albums
Mekaal Hasan Band albums